Matthew Connell (born 3 August 1972) is a former Australian rules footballer who played in the Australian Football League for the Adelaide Crows and West Coast Eagles. Educated at Newman College, he has now returned there as a teacher.

Connell did not have a big impact playing for West Coast but when he moved to Adelaide he had a brilliant season winning the Crows Best and Fairest and a position in the Western Australian State of Origin side. In 1996 Connell had a thigh injury early in the season and when he came back he was not at the level he was in 1995. He played in both of Adelaide's Premierships in 1997 and 1998 but never hit the form he had in 1995 again.

He coached the GB Bulldogs Australian rules football team in the 2005 International Cup, held in Melbourne, guiding the team to a 6th place finish.

Playing statistics

|-
|- style="background-color: #EAEAEA"
! scope="row" style="text-align:center" | 1993
|style="text-align:center;"|
| 42 || 3 || 0 || 1 || 17 || 1 || 18 || 5 || 0 || 0.0 || 0.3 || 5.7 || 0.3 || 6.0 || 1.7 || 0.0
|-
! scope="row" style="text-align:center" | 1994
|style="text-align:center;"|
| 42 || 0 || — || — || — || — || — || — || — || — || — || — || — || — || — || —
|- style="background-color: #EAEAEA"
! scope="row" style="text-align:center" | 1995
|style="text-align:center;"|
| 14 || 21 || 6 || 9 || 329 || 152 || 481 || 109 || 18 || 0.3 || 0.4 || 15.7 || 7.2 || 22.9 || 5.2 || 0.9
|-
! scope="row" style="text-align:center" | 1996
|style="text-align:center;"|
| 14 || 14 || 4 || 3 || 171 || 99 || 270 || 46 || 14 || 0.3 || 0.2 || 12.2 || 7.1 || 19.3 || 3.3 || 1.0
|- style="background-color: #EAEAEA"
! scope="row" style="text-align:center;" | 1997
|style="text-align:center;"|
| 14 || 17 || 6 || 0 || 215 || 62 || 277 || 71 || 25 || 0.4 || 0.0 || 12.6 || 3.6 || 16.3 || 4.2 || 1.5
|-
! scope="row" style="text-align:center;" | 1998
|style="text-align:center;"|
| 14 || 21 || 7 || 3 || 232 || 87 || 319 || 77 || 27 || 0.3 || 0.1 || 11.0 || 4.1 || 15.2 || 3.7 || 1.3
|- style="background-color: #EAEAEA"
! scope="row" style="text-align:center" | 1999
|style="text-align:center;"|
| 14 || 10 || 2 || 3 || 141 || 38 || 179 || 39 || 9 || 0.2 || 0.3 || 14.1 || 3.8 || 17.9 || 3.9 || 0.9
|-
! scope="row" style="text-align:center" | 2000
|style="text-align:center;"|
| 14 || 13 || 3 || 2 || 196 || 60 || 256 || 84 || 11 || 0.2 || 0.2 || 15.1 || 4.6 || 19.7 || 6.5 || 0.8
|- class="sortbottom"
! colspan=3| Career
! 99
! 28
! 21
! 1301
! 499
! 1800
! 431
! 104
! 0.3
! 0.2
! 13.1
! 5.0
! 18.2
! 4.4
! 1.1
|}

Honors
 1995 Adelaide Best-and-Fairest
 1997 Premiership Player
 1998 Premiership Player

References

External links

West Coast Eagles players
Adelaide Football Club players
Adelaide Football Club Premiership players
Subiaco Football Club players
Malcolm Blight Medal winners
Australian rules footballers from Western Australia
1972 births
People educated at Newman College, Perth
Living people
Western Australian State of Origin players
Two-time VFL/AFL Premiership players